The 2015–16 Toronto Marlies season is the American Hockey League franchise's 11th season in the city of Toronto, Ontario. During the season, the Marlies broke numerous franchise records on their way to finishing first in the entire league. This was the Marlies' 5th divisional title and 4th in 5 years. The Marlies also won the Macgregor Kilpatrick Trophy for the first time in franchise history as regular season champions. On February 2, 2016, along with the Toronto Maple Leafs, the Marlies unveiled a new logo, to coincide with the parent club's 100th anniversary.

Various franchise and league records were set by the Marlies, most notably securing the 3rd best record in AHL history, and the best of any team in a 76-game season.

During Game seven of the second round playoff series against Albany, Rich Clune proceeded to score the series-winning goal with under 3 minutes remaining in the third period, his first playoff goal as a professional; after which a fan in the Ricoh Coliseum was spotted with a poster stating "Clune wrestles bears for fun" as an allusion to their next opponent, the Hershey Bears, as well as his role as the main enforcer on the team.

Standings 
 indicates team has clinched division and a playoff spot indicates team has clinched a playoff spot indicates team has been eliminated from playoff contention

Eastern Conference

Western Conference

Regular season

2016 Calder Cup playoffs

Statistics

Regular season

Playoffs

Year-end roster

Updated May 22, 2016.

|}

Notes

References
3.

External links
Official Website of the AHL
Official Website of the Toronto Malies

2015–16 AHL season by team
Toronto Marlies